Ricardo Grinberg (born 14 January 1948), is an Argentine chess FIDE master (FM).

Biography
In the 1970s, Ricardo Grinberg was one of Argentina's leading chess players. He three times participated in the Argentine Chess Championship finals (1974, 1978, 1985). Her best result in this tournament was shared 4th-5th place with Jaime Emma in 1974. Ricardo Grinberg was participant a number of major International Chess Tournaments in South America.

Ricardo Grinberg played for Argentina in the Chess Olympiad:
 In 1978, at second reserve board in the 23rd Chess Olympiad in Buenos Aires (+4, =1, -3).

References

External links

Ricardo Grinberg chess games at 365chess.com

1948 births
Living people
Chess FIDE Masters
Argentine chess players
Chess Olympiad competitors
20th-century chess players